Mechelinki  is a village in the administrative district of Gmina Kosakowo, within Puck County, Pomeranian Voivodeship, in northern Poland. It is located on the Bay of Puck on the coast of the Baltic Sea in the historic region of Pomerania.

The village has a population of 303.

References

Populated coastal places in Poland
Seaside resorts in Poland
Villages in Puck County